Julie Skovsby (born 15 November 1978 in Odense) is a Danish politician, who is a member of the Folketing for the Social Democrats political party. She was elected into parliament at the 2007 Danish general election.

References

External links 
 Biography on the website of the Danish Parliament (Folketinget)

1978 births
Living people
People from Odense
Social Democrats (Denmark) politicians
21st-century Danish women politicians
Women members of the Folketing
Members of the Folketing 2007–2011
Members of the Folketing 2011–2015
Members of the Folketing 2015–2019
Members of the Folketing 2019–2022